Riley Parker is a fictional character from the Australian Network Ten soap opera Neighbours, played by Sweeney Young. He made his first on-screen appearance on 17 August 2007. He was involved in various storylines most notably an incest plot.  The character was axed in 2008 and departed on 23 May 2008.

Character creation
In 2007 Neighbours suffered one of its worst decline in ratings and several key changes took place, including the introduction of a new family. Network Ten drama executive Dan Bennett revealed that the show would return to the focus on relationships and family dynamics Several regular characters left the show to make way for the Parker family. Australian drama actress, Nikki Coghill was cast as matriarch of the family, Miranda Parker and Steve Bastoni was cast as her husband Steve Parker. Eloise Mignon was also cast as sister Bridget Parker. Sweeney Young received the part of Riley. Young revealed he auditioned alone for throughout the audition process, whereas Mignon and Coghill both auditioned together in later stages through screen tests. The Parker family made their first appearance on-screen in July 2007, marking the start of the show's renovation.

In 2008, Riley was axed from the soap opera, in which Young stated: "I’m incredibly excited, I can’t wait to take all the stuff I’ve learnt at Neighbours and apply it to other productions."

Character development

Characterisation
Riley is mysterious and has a dark past. During an interview with entertainment website Last Broadcast Young described Riley stating: "He’s a little dark, but a good guy. He has a bit of trouble expressing himself, particularly where his parents and his past are concerned, but at the same time he’s very genuine." Riley's adoption has affected his persona, of this during a separate interview with Last Broadcast, Young said: "The problem is, he feels sensitive about being given up for adoption because it‘s like a rejection to him. He’s also insecure about his adoptive parents and feels unsure about whether they really love him". Riley also had a distinguished laugh which was created by Young. Young's unshaven look was also a concept incorporated into Riley's appearance, with Young stating he auditioned with long hair and a noticeable beard, subsequently producers liked his appearance, thus using it for the Riley. Producers also incorporated a hair cut, in which saw Young reduce his hair length, to complement his character. Of the producer's control over Young's appearance, he was asked if he would change his hair after filming his final scenes, he stated: "I want Definitely shorter hair, long hair is annoying. As soon as work permits I’m going to cut my hair really short."

Incest
In 2008 Riley was involved in a controversial storyline where it was revealed Riley had been pursuing a romance with his adoptive aunt Nicola West (Imogen Bailey). Various media sources reported the story after Australian conservative groups voiced their disapproval of the storyline. The media dramatised the plot in the wake of a real life case in which an Austrian man Josef Fritzl raped his daughter, the storyline was likened to the real life case. The Australian Family Association accused the soap opera of using plots mirroring real life events to attract viewers, branding them 'opportunistic'. The president of its Queensland branch commented on the storyline stating: "Is Neighbours redefining itself as some kind of sick mockumentary? Incest is a very sensitive subject that I wouldn't expect a prime-time program aimed at children to be tackling. They are dealing with young minds who can't fully understand or analyse the issues." Executive producer Susan Bower defended the storyline stating: "It is controversial, but all our stories are handled carefully." The storyline aired regardless of the criticism, in which Heather Pryor (Georgina Andrews) and Bridget discover their affair.

Storylines
Riley was introduced in August 2007, when he moved to Erinsborough and reconciled with his adopted parents, Miranda Parker (Nikki Coghill) and Steve Parker (Steve Bastoni), with whom he had had a falling-out. Riley previously had been doing a course for Veterinary Science and had stated that he had been getting distinctions but near the end of the course decided he didn't want to become a Veterinarian.

He met Elle Robinson (Pippa Black) at Charlie's Bar and the two became friends. After falling for her he competed for her affection with Oliver (David Hoflin). Riley gained a cadet-ship at the Erinsborough News, and shared it with Elle as a result of her losing her old job and finding an interest in journalism. Riley helped his sister Bridget cope with the disability she suffered after a car accident.

Riley and Elle had secretly gone to an illegal dance party to report for Erinsborough News even though they had clear instructions not too, in the end (after the roof collapsed) they both made it out. Riley then revealed his feelings to Elle through a draft of a news article. Elle saw it, blushed and told Riley that she wasn't ready to be involved in a relationship, which Riley didn't believe. After revealing his feelings for Elle, Riley caught the eye of his new coworker Heather and developed a relationship, however Elle reacted a little jealous but Riley and her agreed to be friends.

In early May 2008, Miranda's sister Nicola arrived in Ramsay Street and it was revealed that she and Riley have a past romantic history. When she kissed him, Heather saw and was disgusted Riley would cheat on her, with his aunt. They kept up the affair and tried to keep it from Miranda and Steve. After Bridget discovered Riley and Nicola's relationship, he became worried and was desperate to get away from Nicola, so he decided to go to the Middle East to be war correspondent against his parents will. While the family were out for dinner, Riley packed his bags and left leaving a note in an envelope for Steve and Miranda labelled 'Mum and Dad' on it. However, after he walked out Nicola took the envelope and put it in her pocket. Miranda later saw it and was very annoyed with Nicola. Later on, when Miranda and Steve found out that Nicola had been sleeping with him, they tried to get him to come back but they were unsuccessful.

Reception
Riley has a unique laugh that has been noted in media sources, of this Last Broadcast branded his laugh as an 'awesome' creation. In 2007, Ruth Deller of television website Lowculture gave Riley a mixed review. She said "Riley is decent enough eye candy, but he needs to take his shirt off a bit more, get screwed over by Elle Robinson and go all dewey-eyed with tears. And get a plotline". Sarah Ellis from Inside Soap said that Riley is no bad boy and acted "so nice that he makes cuddly Harold look like a criminal mastermind".

References

Neighbours characters
Adoptee characters in television
Fictional reporters
Television characters introduced in 2007
Male characters in television